The British League Riders Championship was an individual motorcycle speedway contest between the top riders (or two riders) with the highest average from each club competing in the British League in the UK, or the top division of the league during the period when it had two or more divisions. Similar tournaments had been held before the formation of the British League in 1965, including the Provincial League Riders' Championship, open to riders from the Provincial League. The championship has been sponsored by Player's No 10, Skol, Leyland Cars, Gauntlet, Daily Mirror, TNT Sameday and Dunlop. 

The championship continued until the British League Riders' Championship was replaced with the Premier League Riders Championship in 1995.

Results

See also
List of United Kingdom Speedway League Riders' champions
Speedway in the United Kingdom

References

Oakes, Peter (1991) The Complete History of the British League, Front Page Books, 

Speedway competitions in the United Kingdom